HCCA can stand for:
 (Hybrid Coordination Function) Controlled Channel Access
 α-Cyano-4-hydroxycinnamic acid